Many colleges and universities are named after people. Namesakes include the founder of the institution, financial benefactors, revered religious leaders, notable historical figures, members of royalty, current political leaders, and respected teachers or other leaders associated with the institution. This is a list of higher education institutions named for people.

Institutions named for people associated with the institution

Founders or their family members
The following institutions are named for the individual people who are credited as their founders. A few institutions were named by the founder in honor of a parent, child, spouse, or other close family member.

Benefactors or their family members

Other institutional associations

Institutions named for contemporary royalty or politicians
Some educational institutions carry the names of members of royalty or political leaders who were in power at the time the institutions were established or received their present names. Some of these schools were given the names of the leaders who officially chartered them (for example, Charles University of Prague in the Czech Republic and College of William and Mary in the United States). Other institutions may have received other forms of support from their namesakes.

The following list includes both institutions named for members of royalty or politicians in power at the time the institutions received those names and institutions that were named for recently deceased royalty or politicians who may have been special supporters of the schools. Institutions named for family members of such leaders also are listed.

Institutions named in honor of historical people not connected with the institution

Religious figures
The following universities and colleges are named for people who are noted primarily for their contributions to religion, including theologians, saints, holy people, and founders of religious denominations. Most, but not all, of the institutions of higher education named for religious figures are religious institutions.

Shia imams

Other historical figures
Universities and colleges have been named for a diverse variety of historical figures, including national heroes, poets, prominent scientists, and political figures of the past.

See also 
 Lists of etymologies
 List of university and college namesakes

References

Named after people
Lists of people by honor or award
Lists of eponyms
Higher education-related lists